Gadzooks may refer to:
 Gadzooks! (TV programme), a British pop music television programme which aired on BBC2 in the 1960s
 Gadzooks (retailer), T-shirt retailer acquired by Forever 21
 Gadzooks, a dragon from the novel series The Last Dragon Chronicles
 Gadzoox, a storage area network company acquired by Broadcom in 2003